The champion teams of the NBL1 West, formerly the State Basketball League (SBL), are determined annually by a grand final weekend hosted by Basketball Western Australia. All grand finals have been played in a one-game championship decider, except in 1995 when a best-of-three series was used. Since 2010, the WA Basketball Centre has been the grand final host venue.

Champions

Women

Results by teams

Men

Results by teams

Historical records

Past trophies

Pre-SBL

References

State Basketball League lists
NBL1 West
NBL1